Burial Hill is a historic cemetery or burying ground on School Street in Plymouth, Massachusetts.  Established in the 17th century, it is the burial site of several Pilgrims, the founding settlers of Plymouth Colony.  It was listed on the National Register of Historic Places in 2013.

Description
Burial Hill is located just west of Plymouth's Main Street, which parallels the shoreline of Plymouth Bay, and is at the southwest end of Leyden Street, which parallels Town Brook to the south, and was the first street laid out when the Plymouth Colony was founded in 1620. The main entrance to the cemetery is just north of the First Parish Church in Plymouth, whose current building is the fifth to stand on the same site. A network of paved footpaths are laid out through the cemetery's , with stairs located along steeper sections. There are more than 2,000 marked graves, dating from 1680 to 1957.

History

The first Pilgrim burial ground was on nearby Cole's Hill in 1620-21. Originally, the Pilgrims constructed a fort on top of Burial Hill in 1621-22 (a reconstruction exists in nearby Plimoth Plantation). The Burial Hill fort also served as a meeting house for the colony and for the First Parish Church until 1677. According to tradition, the first grave on Burial Hill was Pilgrim John Howland's.  However, he did not die until 1672; other people claimed to be buried there died considerably earlier.

First Parish's congregation currently meets in an 1899 church building at the base of Burial Hill on the town square, near where it first met in 1621.

Notable burials and cenotaphs
Mary Allerton, Pilgrim, last surviving Mayflower passenger
William Bradford, Pilgrim, Governor
William Brewster, church elder
Thomas Cushman, Ruling Elder of the Plymouth Colony, 1649-1691
Robert Cushman, organizer of the Mayflower expedition (cenotaph at Cushman Monument)
Edward Doty, Mayflower passenger
Francis Cooke, Pilgrim, Mayflower passenger
John Howland, Pilgrim, Mayflower passenger
Adoniram Judson, Christian missionary to Asia
Thomas Prence, Colonial Governor
Thomas Russell, judge, collector of customs, and ambassador
Zabdiel Sampson, Congressman
James Warren, Patriot leader
Mercy Otis Warren, author 
Richard Warren, Pilgrim,  Mayflower passenger
Squanto Native American Friend of The Pilgrims

Image gallery

See also
Myles Standish Burial Ground
Cole's Hill
Plymouth Rock
National Register of Historic Places listings in Plymouth County, Massachusetts
Funerary art in Puritan New England

References

External links

Plymouth, Massachusetts - Burial Hill Cemetery

Plymouth Colony
Buildings and structures in Plymouth, Massachusetts
Cemeteries in Plymouth County, Massachusetts
National Register of Historic Places in Plymouth County, Massachusetts
Cemeteries on the National Register of Historic Places in Massachusetts
Burial places of Mayflower passengers
Cemeteries established in the 17th century